"The Other Man" is a song by Canadian rock band Sloan. It was released as the second single from the band's sixth studio album, Pretty Together. "The Other Man" was one of the top 35 most played songs on radio in Canada in 2002.

Inspiration
The song was inspired by Chris Murphy's relationship with Leslie Feist, which describes a love triangle between the two and Broken Social Scene member Andrew Whiteman, whom Feist was also seeing while dating Murphy.

References

2001 singles
Sloan (band) songs
2001 songs
Songs written by Chris Murphy (Canadian musician)